Lauris Dārziņš (born January 28, 1985) is a Latvian professional ice hockey forward who is currently playing with Dinamo Riga in the Kontinental Hockey League (KHL).

Playing career

Junior
Dārziņš was drafted in the 9th round, 268th overall in the 2003 NHL Entry Draft by the Nashville Predators out of the junior hockey system Finnish team Lukko Rauma. In the 2004–05 season, Dārziņš played in the North American WHL with the then-reigning Memorial Cup champion Kelowna Rockets, alongside fellow Predators prospect and 2003 draft choice Shea Weber. In two seasons with the Rockets, Dārziņš recorded 32 goals and 67 points in 90 games, helping the Rockets win the Ed Chynoweth Cup in 2005, although they failed to repeat as Memorial Cup champions.

Return to Europe
After completing two seasons with the Rockets, Dārziņš went unsigned with the Predators and opted to return to Finland in 2006, signing with Ilves Tampere of the SM-liiga. After just thirteen games, Dārziņš moved to HC Vsetín, then of the Czech Extraliga, where he again played just thirteen games, scoring three goals.

In the summer of 2007, Dārziņš signed on with HC Třinec but played just one game for the club before latching on with HK Gomel of the Belarusian Extraleague. Dārziņš finally broke through professionally with a strong campaign for the Belarusian side, with seventeen goals and 34 points in 32 games in the 2007–08 campaign, leading the team in goals and points. This strong season garnered him some attention among stronger Eastern European clubs, and on May 27, 2008, he signed on with Russian club HC MVD of the newly re-branded Russian SuperLeague.

Dinamo Riga
Dārziņš would never play a game for MVD and eventually landed with the resurrected Dinamo Riga club in his hometown for the team's inaugural campaign. Dārziņš scored just eight goals and seventeen points in 56 games, and the team scored just 132 goals total but found their way into the playoffs before getting swept in the first round by Dynamo Moscow.

Dārziņš would return to Riga in 2009–10 and enjoyed a breakout season. The winger scored fourteen goals, was the third-most on the team, and had 31 total points in 54 games. Riga returned to the playoffs, upsetting top-seeded SKA Saint Petersburg three games to one, but falling in the second round to MVD four games to one. Dārziņš scored two goals and four points in nine playoff games.

In the spring of 2010, Dārziņš' contract with Riga expired. After being briefly linked with Russian powerhouse club Ak Bars Kazan, Dārziņš revealed that he had been in contact with scouts with the NHL club that drafted him, the Nashville Predators, about a possible return to North American hockey. At the end of the 2009–10 season, Dārziņš was the fourth-leading scorer in Riga's two-year history, with 47 points in 112 games.

Dārziņš ultimately spurned any forays into North America in favor of another season with his hometown club. He was rewarded with his best offensive totals at any level, scoring 21 goals and 23 assists in 45 games for Dinamo, leading the team in goals and points. Dārziņš was named to the 2011 KHL All-Star Game in St. Petersburg as part of Team Yashin and finished 16th in the KHL in scoring. Dinamo returned to the Gagarin Cup playoffs, with Dārziņš scoring ten points in eleven games as Riga upset Dynamo Moscow four games to two in the first round.

On May 3, 2011, Dārziņš joined Ak Bars Kazan on a multi-year contract. In June 2013 he was traded to Traktor Chelyabinsk. In January 2014, Dārziņš returned to Dinamo Riga.

International play
Dārziņš has been a regular fixture on the Latvian national team at varying levels since 2002. At 17, he made his debut with the national team at the Division I (second tier) IIHF World U18 Championship, scoring two goals and three total points in five games. Dārziņš returned to the U18s the following year, posting one goal and two points in five games. He broke through with the Under-20 team in 2003 and would go on to play in three Division I IIHF World U20 Championships, where he would score 12 goals and 24 points in 15 games over three tournaments.

In 2006, Dārziņš made his debut with the full national team as a 21-year-old in the 2006 Men's World Ice Hockey Championships, which were held in his hometown of Riga. He has not missed the tournament since his debut, scoring nine goals and twelve points in 23 games over four tournaments.

In February 2010, Dārziņš represented Latvia at the 2010 Winter Olympics in Vancouver, recording one assist in four games. At the 2014 Winter Olympics, he was the leading scorer on the Latvian team with four goals and one assist in five games.

Career statistics

Regular season and playoffs

International

References

External links

1985 births
Living people
Ak Bars Kazan players
Dinamo Riga players
Expatriate ice hockey players in Russia
HK Gomel players
Ice hockey players at the 2010 Winter Olympics
Ice hockey players at the 2014 Winter Olympics
Ice hockey players at the 2022 Winter Olympics
Ilves players
Kelowna Rockets players
Latvian ice hockey left wingers
Nashville Predators draft picks
Olympic ice hockey players of Latvia
Ice hockey people from Riga
VHK Vsetín players
HC Oceláři Třinec players
Traktor Chelyabinsk players
Latvian expatriate sportspeople in Finland
Latvian expatriate sportspeople in the Czech Republic
Latvian expatriate sportspeople in Russia
Latvian expatriate sportspeople in Canada
Latvian expatriate sportspeople in Belarus
Expatriate ice hockey players in Finland
Expatriate ice hockey players in the Czech Republic
Expatriate ice hockey players in Russia
Expatriate ice hockey players in Canada
Expatriate ice hockey players in Belarus
Latvian expatriate ice hockey people